Pierre Euclide Conner (27 June 1932, Houston, Texas – 3 February 2018, New Orleans, Louisiana) was an American mathematician, who worked on algebraic topology and differential topology (especially cobordism theory).

In 1955 Conner received his Ph.D from Princeton University under Donald Spencer with thesis The Green's and Neumann's Problems for Differential Forms on Riemannian Manifolds. He was a post-doctoral fellow from 1955 to 1957 (and again in 1961–1962) at the Institute for Advanced Study. He was in the 1960s a professor at the University of Virginia, where he collaborated with his colleague Edwin E. Floyd, and then in the 1970s a professor at Louisiana State University.

In 2012 he became a fellow of the American Mathematical Society.

Publications

Articles

with E. E. Floyd: 
with E. E. Floyd:

Books
with E. E. Floyd: Differentiable periodic maps, Springer, Ergebnisse der Mathematik und ihrer Grenzgebiete, 1964, 2nd edn. 1979
with E. E. Floyd: The relation of cobordism to K-theories, Lecture Notes in Mathematics, vol. 28, 1966
Seminar on periodic maps, Springer 1966

References

1932 births
2018 deaths
20th-century American mathematicians
21st-century American mathematicians
Academics from Houston
Princeton University alumni
University of Virginia faculty
Louisiana State University faculty
Fellows of the American Mathematical Society
Topologists
Mathematicians from Texas